Liu Qiang (born December 14, 1982 in Shenyang, Liaoning) is a Chinese amateur lightweight boxer who fought at the 2012 Olympics.

At his first major tournament, the 2011 World Amateur Boxing Championships
he beat two opponents then lost to Han Soon-Chul.

He qualified for the 2012 Olympics by winning the 2012 Asian Boxing Olympic Qualification Tournament. At the Olympic tournament (results) he defeated Australian Luke Jackson but lost 10:14 to Cuban Yasniel Toledo.

References

External links
AIBA Bio

1982 births
Living people
Boxers at the 2012 Summer Olympics
Lightweight boxers
Olympic boxers of China
Sportspeople from Liaoning
Chinese male boxers
21st-century Chinese people